Michael Perry (born November 10, 1958) is an American college basketball coach who last served as an assistant men's basketball coach at East Carolina University.  Prior to joining the Pirates program, he served as the head men's basketball coach at Georgia State University from 2003 through 2007, and also held assistant coaching positions at Georgia State, Richmond and Virginia Union University. Perry also served as interim head coach of East Carolina for most of the 2017-18 season, as head coach Jeff Lebo underwent hip surgery and stepped down from the position on November 29, 2017.

Perry played for the University of Richmond from 1978 through 1981 and finished his career as the Spiders' career leader in points scored (2,145).  Only Johnny Newman has since surpassed that total in a Spiders uniform.  Perry was selected in the ninth round of the 1981 NBA draft by the Kansas City Kings.

Head coaching record

References

1958 births
Living people
Basketball coaches from North Carolina
Basketball players from North Carolina
College men's basketball head coaches in the United States
East Carolina Pirates men's basketball coaches
Georgia State Panthers men's basketball coaches
Kansas City Kings draft picks
People from Oxford, North Carolina
Richmond Spiders men's basketball coaches
Richmond Spiders men's basketball players
American men's basketball players